Jeonju Ongoeul was a South Korean soccer club based in the city of Jeonju. It was a member of the K3 League, an amateur league and the third tier of league football in South Korea.

Since 2008, the club has been participated in the Korean football league setup but confirmed it would withdraw from the league owing to the financial stringency before the 2010 season began.

Statistics

 1: Jeonju Ongoeul have 6 points deducted.

See also
 List of football clubs in South Korea

External links
 Jeonju Ongoeul FC unofficial website

K3 League (2007–2019) clubs
Sport in Jeonju
Association football clubs established in 2005
2005 establishments in South Korea
2010 disestablishments in South Korea
Defunct football clubs in South Korea